The Iller (ancient name Ilargus) is a river of Bavaria and Baden-Württemberg in Germany.

It is formed at the confluence of the rivers Breitach, Stillach and Trettach near Oberstdorf in the Allgäu region of the Alps, close to the Austrian border. From there it runs northwards, passing the towns of Sonthofen, Immenstadt, and Kempten. The river flows into the Danube in the city centre of Ulm.

The power of the river is used for the production of hydroelectricity via eight power stations with a total net capacity of 51 MW (1998).

A bicycle route follows the Iller, which is also a popular location for rafting and trekking.

See also 
List of rivers of Bavaria
List of rivers of Baden-Württemberg

Sources 
 Bogner, Franz X. (2009). Allgäu und Iller aus der Luft. Theiss-Verlag 2009. .
 Kettemann, Otto and Winkler, Ursula (ed.): Die Iller, 2000,  (2nd, expanded edition)
 Nowotny, Peter (1999). Die Iller und ihr Tal, 1999, Verlag Eberl,

References

 
Rivers of Baden-Württemberg
Rivers of Bavaria
Rivers of Germany